The Roman Catholic Archdiocese of Benin City is the Metropolitan See for the Ecclesiastical province of Benin City in Nigeria.

History
 1884.05.02: Established as Apostolic Prefecture of Upper Niger from the Apostolic Vicariate of Two Guineas in Gabon
 1911.08.24: Renamed as Apostolic Prefecture of Western Nigeria
 1918.08.24: Promoted as Apostolic Vicariate of Western Nigeria
 1943.01.12: Renamed as Apostolic Vicariate of Asaba-Benin
 1950.04.18: Promoted as Diocese of Benin City
 1994.03.26: Promoted as Metropolitan Archdiocese of Benin City

Special churches
The seat of the archbishop is Holy Cross Cathedral in Benin City.

Bishops
 Prefect Apostolic of Western Nigeria (Roman rite)
 Fr. Carlo Zappa, S.M.A. 1911 – 1917
 Vicars Apostolic of Western Nigeria (Roman rite)
 Bishop Thomas Broderick, S.M.A. 1918.08.24 – 1933.10.13
 Bishop Leo Hale Taylor, S.M.A. 1934.02.26 – 1939.06.13, appointed Vicar Apostolic of Costa di Benin; future Archbishop
 Vicar Apostolic of Asaba-Benin (Roman rite)
 Bishop Patrick Joseph Kelly, S.M.A. 1939.12.11 – 1950.04.18 see below
 Bishops of Benin City (Roman rite)
 Bishop Patrick Joseph Kelly, S.M.A. see above 1950.04.18 – 1973.07.05
 Bishop Patrick Ebosele Ekpu 1973.07.05 – 1994.03.26 see below
 Metropolitan Archbishops of Benin City (Roman rite)
 Archbishop Patrick Ebosele Ekpu see above 1994.03.26 – 2006.11.21
 Archbishop Richard Anthony Burke, S.P.S 2007.12.24 - 2010.05.31
 Archbishop Augustine Obiora Akubeze (since March 18, 2011)

Coadjutor Bishop
Patrick Ebosele Ekpu (1971-1973)

Other priest of this diocese who became bishop
Gabriel Ghiakhomo Dunia, appointed Bishop of Auchi in  2002

Suffragan Dioceses
 Auchi
 Bomadi
 Issele-Uku
 Uromi
 Warri

See also
 Roman Catholicism in Nigeria

Sources
 Catholic Bishops' Conference of Nigeria
 Official website of the Roman Catholic Archdiocese of Benin City 
 GCatholic.org
 Catholic Hierarchy
Fides News Agency Acta of the Holy See
 Catholic Secretariat of Nigeria page for Benin City

Roman Catholic dioceses in Nigeria
Benin City
Roman Catholic Ecclesiastical Province of Benin City